William Edwin Ives (born August 9, 1941) is a Canadian retired professional hockey player who played 421 games in the Eastern Hockey League with the Johnstown Jets and Salem Rebels.

External links
 

1941 births
Living people
Sportspeople from Niagara Falls, Ontario
Ice hockey people from Ontario
Johnstown Jets players
Salem Rebels players
Canadian expatriate ice hockey players in the United States
Canadian ice hockey centres